The Asheville Championship is a two-day college basketball tournament held in Asheville, NC at Harrah's Cherokee Center. The inaugural tournament took place during the opening week of the 2021–22 season, and aired  on the ESPN family of networks.

Champions

Brackets

2022

2021 
* – Denotes overtime period

References

External Links
Asheville Championship

2021 establishments in North Carolina
Basketball in North Carolina
Sports competitions in North Carolina
College men's basketball competitions in the United States
College basketball competitions
Recurring sporting events established in 2021